Novomikhaylovka is a rural locality (a selo) in Novomikhaylovsky Selsoviet, Loktevsky District, Altai Krai, Russia. The population was 216 as of 2013. There are 7 streets.

Geography 
Novomikhaylovka is located 28 km northwest of Gornyak (the district's administrative centre) by road. Removsky is the nearest rural locality.

References 

Rural localities in Loktevsky District